Luxology, LLC is a software company that creates 3D software products. One of its primary products is the 3D art software modo.

In September 2012, the company merged with The Foundry.

References

External links 

 Luxology on CNET

Software companies based in California
Software companies based in London
Software companies of the United States
Apple Design Awards recipients